The Women's Slalom in the 2017 FIS Alpine Skiing World Cup involved 10 events, including one parallel slalom (a city event, which only allows for 16 competitors) and the season finale in Aspen, Colorado (USA).

Defending champion Mikaela Shiffrin from the United States won seven of the ten races for the season, podiumed in two more, and clinched the discipline title before the finals -- ultimately winning the season championship by over 250 points; this was Shiffrin's fourth discipline championship in slalom. Her win enabled Shiffrin to equal the record set by the great 1970s Swedish skier Ingemar Stenmark of winning four World Cup slalom season titles before the age of 22. 

The season was interrupted by the 2017 World Ski Championships, which were held from 6–20 February in St. Moritz, Switzerland. The women's slalom was held on 18 February.

Standings
 

DNF1 = Did Not Finish run 1
DSQ1 = Disqualified run 1
DNQ = Did not qualify for run 2
DNF2 = Did Not Finish run 2
DSQ2 = Disqualified run 2
DNS = Did Not Start

See also
 2017 Alpine Skiing World Cup – Women's summary rankings
 2017 Alpine Skiing World Cup – Women's Overall
 2017 Alpine Skiing World Cup – Women's Downhill
 2017 Alpine Skiing World Cup – Women's Super-G
 2017 Alpine Skiing World Cup – Women's Giant Slalom
 2017 Alpine Skiing World Cup – Women's Combined

References

External links
 Alpine Skiing at FIS website

Women's Slalom
FIS Alpine Ski World Cup slalom women's discipline titles